The Pusher is a Swedish music group.

History 
The Pusher was founded in summer 2007 and consists of the members Pontus Karlsson (drums), Jakke Erixson (vocals, bass), Karl-Ola Solem (guitar) und John Hårleman (keyboard). The four musicians come from different places in Sweden and have come together to make music. The band signed with EMI.

Their debut album, The Art Of Hit Music, was released on 19 August 2011. The first single, Blinded By The Dark, went straight to number one on the Swedish iTunes charts. The second single release, Blow Me And Run, followed on 4 November 2011,

Trivia 
Hårlemans ancestors designed the Stockholm Palace. Thus, the family has a private room for them in the palace. In addition, his father is a knight.

Erixson was born in Gränna, the city in which polkagris was invented.

Discography

References

External links 
 Official Website
 Westfälischer Anzeiger accessed on 3 November 2011

Musical groups established in 2007
Swedish pop music groups
2007 establishments in Sweden